Thyrocopa minor is a moth of the family Xyloryctidae. It was first described by Lord Walsingham in 1907. It is endemic to the Hawaiian island of Molokai and possibly extinct.

The length of the forewings is about 9  mm. Adults are on the wing at least in June. The ground colour of the forewings is mottled light brown and brown. The discal area is clouded with poorly defined brownish spots in the cell. There is a curving poorly defined whitish band through the terminal area and there are dark, evenly spaced spots on the distal half of the costa and along the termen at the vein endings. The hindwings are brown, but the anal margin is darker. The fringe is brown.

External links

Thyrocopa
Endemic moths of Hawaii
Biota of Molokai
Moths described in 1907